Johann Nepomuk Hummel's Piano Concerto No. 3 in B minor, Op. 89 was composed in Vienna in 1819 and published in Leipzig in 1821.

Unlike his earlier piano concerti, which closely followed the model of Mozart's, the B minor concerto along with the slightly earlier Concerto No. 2 is written in a proto-Romantic style that anticipates the later stylistic developments of composers such as Frédéric Chopin, Robert Schumann, Franz Liszt and Felix Mendelssohn.

Date of composition and scoring
The piano concerto was written by Hummel as a showcase for his virtuosity at the instrument. It was written while the composer was in Vienna in 1819 and is scored for piano, flute, two oboes, 2 clarinets in A, 2 bassoons, 4 horns in D, G, and B, 2 trumpets in B, timpani, and strings. Notable is the sparsely scored second movement nocturne, accompanied by only the horns, cellos, and basses.

The work was a favourite of Franz Liszt in his early career - when he performed it at the Paris Opera he was taken to task by a reviewer who complained in an open letter about the hectic speed the teenage Liszt took the finale.

Movements
The work is composed in traditional three movement form.

 I. Allegro moderato (B minor)
 II. Larghetto (G major)
 III. Finale: Vivace (B minor – B major)

Notes

References
 M.F. Humphries, The Piano Concertos of Johann Nepomuk Hummel, PhD Dissertation (Northwestern University, 1957)
 B.H. Kim, Johann Nepomuk Hummel and His Contribution to Piano Music and the Art of Playing the Piano (University of Rochester, 1967)

External links
 

Compositions by Johann Nepomuk Hummel
Hummel 3
1819 compositions
Compositions in B minor